Atlantic Coast Lumber Company was formed in 1899 when the potential value of the vast amounts of standing timber in the Pee Dee River watershed was discovered by a group of Northern lumbermen. Options were taken by the company on this timber and that of surrounding 
counties. A large sawmill was built west of the city of Georgetown and production began. In 1903, the company was 
incorporated with a capital of one million dollars.

The mill was expanded through the years, and included three separate sawmills, two shipping wharves, several warehouses, 
and numerous other buildings, including workers' houses, stores, a hotel, a church, etc. The company owned all of 
these buildings, making the area immediately surrounding the mill a veritable "company town", (see photo below). In 1913, 
a disastrous fire destroyed two of the sawmills. A new steel and concrete mill was erected within ten months. At peak 
production, the company could produce 600,000 board feet (1,400 m³) of lumber per day and was properly proclaimed "the largest 
lumber manufacturing plant on the Atlantic Coast." Due to the effects of the Great Depression, the plant was closed in 
1932.

It was a major undertaking to move millions of tons of rock to the two barrier islands at the entrance to the harbor and 
build "jetties" of over 11,000 feet on the north and 21, 000 feet on the south entrance of the bay, with steam and sail 
power. A dredge was built to maintain a channel and, coupled with the railway and the river system, the lumber business 
flourished. Mills sprang up almost overnight. The Atlantic Coast Lumber Company was the largest in the world with its 
5,000,000 board foot (12,000 m³) dock and shed. Turpentine, pine rosin, shingles, furniture - but none as unusual as the DuPont wood alcohol and dynamite mill.

External links
company tokens and photos
Georgetown area history

Companies based in South Carolina
Forest products companies of the United States
1899 establishments in South Carolina
American companies established in 1899
Pee Dee River